One thing the most visited websites have in common is that they are dynamic websites. Their development typically involves server-side coding, client-side coding and database technology. The programming languages applied to deliver dynamic web content, however, vary vastly between sites.

*data on programming languages is based on:
 HTTP Header information
 Request for file types
 Citations from reliable sources

See also

 Comparison of programming languages
 List of programming languages
 TIOBE index
 "Hello, World!" program

References

Software comparisons
Web development